The 2011 CONCACAF Under-20 Championship was expanded to 12 teams beginning in 2011.  The tournament determined the four CONCACAF teams that participated at the 2011 FIFA U-20 World Cup to be held in Colombia. In addition, the top three finishers from Central America or the Caribbean, in addition to hosts Mexico, qualified to participate at the 2011 Pan American Games. The Executive Committee approved that for men's U-20 championships all three North American teams again qualified automatically for the finals. Central America received four berths, and the Caribbean received five.

The new allocations give Central America one more berth than it had in 2009 and the Caribbean three more. On 1 September 2010 CONCACAF announced Guatemala as host of the championship, played from 3–17 April.

The championship was scheduled to be held a week later but was moved ahead one week due to a scheduling conflict.

Qualified teams

Squads

Venues
The tournament was hosted in two stadia.

Draw
The draw for the final tournament took place on February 11 in Guatemala City, Guatemala, dividing the 12 sides into four, three-team groups.

Status of Guadeloupe
Guadeloupe is a member of CONCACAF but not a member of FIFA. As such, they are eligible to compete for CONCACAF Championships but are not eligible to qualify for the FIFA U-20 World Cup. If they had reached the semifinals of this tournament, the 4th team from CONCACAF to qualify for the 2011 FIFA U-20 World Cup would have been the losing quarterfinalist who gained the most points in the group stage. If two or more teams had been tied, then a drawing of lots would have been be used.

Group stage

Group A

Group B

Group C

Group D

Knockout stage

Quarterfinals

Semifinals

Third-place match

Final

Goalscorers

 6 goals
  Joel Campbell

 4 goals

  Ulises Dávila
  Cecilio Waterman

 3 goals

  Mynor Miller
  Gerson Lima
  Taufic Guarch
  Alan Pulido
  Kelyn Rowe

 2 goals

  Bryan Vega
  Alexander López
  Conor Doyle

 1 goal

  Derrick Bassi
  Lucas Cavallini
  Joshua Diaz
  Juan Golobio
  Joseph Mora
  Deyver Vega
  Yaudel Lahera
  Christophe Houelche
  Henry Lopez
  Elías Vásquez
  Ever Alvarado
  Anthony Lozano
  Nestor Martinez
  Neco Brett
  Kristian Álvarez
  Diego de Buen
  David Izazola
  Jorge Mora
  Carlos Emilio Orrantía
  Edson Rivera
  José Álvarez
  Javier Caicedo
  Joseph Gyau
  Bobby Wood

Own goals

  Renay Malblanche for  Mexico
  Jhamie Hyde for  Guatemala
  Oscar Linton for  Mexico

Final ranking

Note: Per statistical convention in football, matches decided in extra time are counted as wins and losses, while matches decided by penalty shoot-out are counted as draws.

Countries to participate in 2011 FIFA U-20 World Cup
Top 4 teams qualified for the 2011 FIFA U-20 World Cup.

Countries to participate in 2011 Pan American Games
4 teams qualified for the 2011 Pan American Games.
The highest finisher from each the Caribbean and Central American regions will qualify, along with the best qualifying team from either region
 (host nation)
 (The highest finisher from Caribbean Region)
 (The highest finisher from Central American Region)
 (best qualifying team from both Region)
Guatemala withdrew from the Pan American Games and was replaced by Trinidad and Tobago.

See also
 2011 FIFA U-20 World Cup
 CONCACAF

References

External links
 

 
2011
Under
2011 CONCACAF U-20 Championship
Qualification tournaments for the 2011 Pan American Games
2011 in youth association football